The 2019-20 American International Yellow Jackets men's ice hockey season was the 72nd season of play for the program, the 24th at the Division I level, and the 17th season in the Atlantic Hockey conference. The Yellow Jackets represented American International College and were coached by Eric Lang, in his 4th season.

On March 12, 2020, Atlantic Hockey announced that the remainder of the conference tournament was cancelled due to the coronavirus pandemic.

Departures

Recruiting

Roster
As of September 12, 2019.

|}

Standings

Schedule and results

|-
!colspan=12 style=";" | Regular Season

|-
!colspan=12 style=";" | 
|- align="center" bgcolor="#e0e0e0"
|colspan=12|Tournament Cancelled

Scoring Statistics

Goaltending statistics

Rankings

Awards and honors

NCAA

Atlantic Hockey

References

2019–20
2019–20 Atlantic Hockey men's ice hockey season
2019–20 NCAA Division I men's ice hockey by team
2019 in sports in Massachusetts
2020 in sports in Massachusetts